was an Okinawan interpreter (Chinese-Okinawan). He was ordered to learn harelip surgery and successfully performed the surgery for the grandson of King Shō Tei, Shō Eki, under general anesthesia.

"Takamine Tokumei" was his Japanese style name, while  was his Chinese style name.

Life and achievements
He was born on February 15, 1653, in Shuri, Ryūkyū Kingdom. Being very bright in his childhood, he went to Fuzhou at age 10, and learned Chinese in three years. He became an interpreter and he was given the name 魏士哲(Gi Shitetsu) by King Sho Tei. In 1688, he was a secretary and was on his 4th visit to Fuzhou, and he learned that a boatman received surgery and his harelip was corrected. The grandson of King Shō Tei, Shō Eki, had harelip. The four representatives of the Ryūkyū Kingdom at Fuzhou ordered Tokumei to learn surgery because of his Chinese and his skill. Earlier, a secretary named Oomine Sen-yu (大嶺詮雄, birth and death unknown) was ordered to learn surgery but he was unsuccessful. The Chinese physician was Huang Huiyou (Chinese: 黄會友; in Japanese: Kō Kaiyū). He first refused to teach surgery because it was a secret, but finally agreed to teach surgery due to the eagerness of Tokumei. After 20 days of learning, Tokumei showed his skill and corrected the harelip of a 13-year-old boy before his teacher.  Tokumei was given a book of the surgery and returned to Okinawa Island in May, 1689. He performed surgery on 5 patients and performed surgery for the King's 10-year-old grandson Shō Eki on October 23. The surgery was successful and it was said that no scar was visible. He performed the surgery under general anesthesia, 115 years prior to Hanaoka Seishu who performed the removal of mammary cancer under general anesthesia, the first general anesthesia in Japan. In 1690 he taught Satsuma doctors this surgery and in 1714 to Ryūkyūan doctors.<ref>Arashiro Toshiaki, Ryukyu-Okinawa Rekishi Jinbutusuden  OkinawaJijishuppan, 12006. p. 66–68</ref>

Matsuki Akitomo
It was Matsuki Akitomo, the professor of anesthesiology, Hirosaki University who reported about this surgery first in the medical world. He wrote that a half century has passed since K. Higaonna, a historian from Okinawa, first reported that in 1689 Tokumei Takamine (1653–1738) had performed successfully a hare-lip operation under general anesthesia with mafutsu-san for a royal grandchild Shō Eki of the Second Shō Dynasty in the Ryukyus, now known as Okinawa.

See also
 History of general anesthesia
 Hanaoka Seishū
 Nakachi Kijin

References
 Arashiro Toshiaki, Ryukyu-Okinawa Rekishi Jinbutsuden'', Okinawajijishuppan, 2006 p66 
 Takamine Tokuakiwith a drawing of Takamine
 [New study on the history of anesthesiology--(5) and (6). Reevaluation of surgical achievements by Tokumei Takamine].Matsuki A. Masui. 2000 Nov;49(11):1285-9. Japanese.
 [The secret anesthetic used in the repair of a hare-lip performed by Tokumei Takamine in Ryukyu] (Jpn).Matsuki A. Nippon Ishigaku Zasshi. 1985 Oct;31(4):463-89. Japanese.

Footnotes

Japanese surgeons
History of medicine in China
People of the Ryukyu Kingdom
Ueekata
Ryukyuan people
Ryukyuan people of Chinese descent
Japanese anesthesiologists
1653 births
1738 deaths
17th-century Ryukyuan people
18th-century Ryukyuan people
17th-century Japanese physicians
18th-century Japanese physicians
History of anesthesia